Tetramethylpyrazine, also known as ligustrazine, is a chemical compound found in nattō and in fermented cocoa beans. In an observational study, tetramethylpyrazine was the dominant volatile organic compound in one sourdough starter.  When purified, tetramethylpyrazine is a colorless solid.  It is classified as an alkylpyrazine.  Its biosynthesis involves amination of acetoin, the latter derived from pyruvate.  It exhibits potential nootropic and antiinflammatory activities in rats.

References 

Anti-inflammatory agents
Pyrazines
Fermented soy-based foods
Components of chocolate